Baudouin Ribakare is a Burundian professional football manager.

Career
Since 1992 until 2000 he coached the Burundi national football team. Summer 2000 he was named new coach of the TSV Oberhaunstadt. In 2003-2004 he called from Germany to rescue the Burundi national football team.

References

External links

Year of birth missing (living people)
Living people
Burundian football managers
Burundi national football team managers
Place of birth missing (living people)